Kirsten van de Westeringh (born 6 June 2001) is a Dutch footballer who plays as a midfielder for ADO Den Haag in the Eredivisie.

References

Living people
Dutch women's footballers
Eredivisie (women) players
2001 births
Women's association football midfielders
ADO Den Haag (women) players
People from Zeewolde
Footballers from Flevoland